The Medium (also known as Medium Rare) is Singapore's first full-length English language film. It was released in local cinemas in late 1991 and produced by Singaporean Errol Pang. It was initially supposed to be directed by a Singaporean, Tony Yeow, then by an American, Stan Barret, and finally by Arthur Smith, who was British. The Medium was initially seen as a revival of the local film industry. Starring Brenda Bakke, Margaret Chan and Dore Kraus. Zhu Houren also cameos as a coffeeshop owner whose wife ends up getting cheated by the main antagonist.

Plot
The Medium is loosely based on the Toa Payoh ritual murders of 1981, and its perpetrator, Adrian Lim, with a supernatural twist to the ending. Lim murdered two children and was sentenced to death in 1988. However, in the movie ending, the main character based on Adrian Lim escaped from the prison and ran into an incoming truck where Satan catches him and subjected him to eternal torture. This was said to be added to re-assure audience that crime does not pay.

Production
The film cost S$1.84 million to produce with Pang financing S$1.2 million on his own.

Reception
A Straits Times panel liked the storyline, but found the pace was slow, with a weak script with no scare factor. Local newspaper The New Paper found the film clichéd and unconvincing.

The film did not break even and only earned S$130,000 in Singapore during its run.

References

External links 
 

1992 films
1990s thriller films
Singaporean multilingual films
1990s English-language films